Parisiennes or The Doctor's Women is a 1928 German-Swedish silent film directed by Gustaf Molander and starring Margit Manstad, Ruth Weyher and Fred Louis Lerch.

The film's sets were designed by the art director Robert Neppach.

Cast
 Margit Manstad as Nita Duval
 Ruth Weyher as Jeanne Duval
 Fred Louis Lerch as Dr. Leon Monnier
 Miles Mander as Armand de Marny
 Alexander Murski as Gambetta Duval, der Vater
 Karin Swanström as Rose Duval, die Witwe
 Margita Alfvén as Ms. Savelly, Schauspielerin
 Norah Baring
 Georg Blomstedt as Pinet, Theaterdirektor
 Hans Junkermann as Count Rochefort
 Alexander Nadler as Der kleine Philippe
 Alexandra Nalder as Philippa
 Jeanne Weiß as Eine elegante Dame
 Elisabeth Frisk

References

Bibliography
 Tommy Gustafsson. Masculinity in the Golden Age of Swedish Cinema: A Cultural Analysis of 1920s Films. McFarland, 2014.

External links

1928 films
Swedish silent feature films
Films of the Weimar Republic
German silent feature films
Films directed by Gustaf Molander
Films set in Paris
UFA GmbH films
German black-and-white films
Swedish black-and-white films
1920s German films